Maniyankode Padmaprabha Veerendra Kumar (22 July 1936 — 28 May 2020) was an Indian politician, writer and journalist, who was a member of the 14th Lok Sabha. He was a member of the Loktantrik Janata Dal political party and president of the Kerala state branch of the party. He was also the chairman and managing director of the Malayalam daily newspaper Mathrubhumi.

Life
Veerendra Kumar was born on 22 July 1936 to Marudevi Avva and M. K. Padmaprabha Goudar, a leader of Socialist Party and former MLA, in Kalpetta. The eldest of their eight children, he had six younger sisters and a younger brother. After schooling in Kalpetta and Kozhikode, he did his master's in philosophy from the Ramakrishna Mission Vivekananda College.

As a politician, he was treasurer and a national committee member of the former Samyukta Socialist Party, state secretary of the Kerala Unit of the Socialist Party, one of the all India secretaries of the former Socialist Party, convener of the Opposition Co-ordination Committee in Kerala, vice president of the former Janata Party, and its president. He was arrested during The Emergency. From 1987–91 he was a member of the Kerala Legislative Assembly. Later, in 1996 he was elected to the Lok Sabha, lower house of the Parliament of India from Kozhikode constituency and served as Union Minister of State for Finance in Deve Gowde Ministry from 21 February 1997 to 7 June 1997. He also served as Union Minister of State for Labour (Independent charge) with additional charges as Minister of State, Urban Affairs & Employment (Independent charges) and Parliamentary Affairs in I.K.Gujral Ministry from 10 June 1997 to March.

He died on 28 May 2020 due to cardiac arrest at Kozhikode in Kerala. He was aged 83 when he died, and was suffering from many age-related illnesses. He was cremated with full state honours at the premises of his ancestral home in Kalpetta. He is survived by his wife Usha, daughters Asha, Nisha and Jayalakshmi, son M.V. Sreyamskumar (Also a politician, currently serving as the Managing Director of Mathrubhumi), and many grandchildren.

Publications
His works as an author include:

Samanwayathinte Vasantham
Buddhante Chiri
Gattum Kanacharadukalum
Atmavilekkoru Theerthayathra
Prathibhayute Verukal Thedi
Changampuzha: Vidhiyute Vettamrigam
Thirinjhunokkumbol
Lokavyapara Samkhadanayum Oorakkudukkukalum (Gattinu Seshamulla Oranweshanam)
Roshathinte Vithukal
Adhinivesathinte Adiyozhukukal
Hymavathabhoovil
Ramantedhukkam
Vivekanandan: Sanyasiyum Manushyanum

Awards
V. R. Krishnan Ezhuthachan Janmasadabdi Award (2009)
Kendra Sahitya Academy Award (2010) - for Haimavatha bhoovil

References

|-

|-

External links

1936 births
2020 deaths
India MPs 2004–2009
Malayali politicians
People from Wayanad district
Malayalam-language journalists
India MPs 1996–1997
Lok Sabha members from Kerala
Samyukta Socialist Party politicians
Janata Dal (United) politicians
Janata Dal politicians
Rajya Sabha members from Kerala
Loktantrik Janata Dal politicians
Socialist Janata (Democratic) politicians
Recipients of the Sahitya Akademi Award in Malayalam
Recipients of the Abu Dhabi Sakthi Award